Ruellia densa is a plant native to the Cerrado region of Brazil.

See also
 List of plants of Cerrado vegetation of Brazil

densa
Flora of Brazil